Weverton may refer to:

People
Weverton (footballer, born 1987), full name Weverton Pereira da Silva, Brazilian football goalkeeper
Wéverton (footballer, born 1992), full name Wéverton Gomes Souza, Brazilian football forward
Weverton (footballer, born 1999), full name Weverton Guilherme da Silva Souza, Brazilian football right-back
Weverton (footballer, born 2003), full name Weverton Silva de Andrade, Brazilian football defender

Places
 Weverton, Maryland, unincorporated community in Washington County, Maryland

See also
Ferrugem (footballer, born 1988), full name Weverton Almeida Santos, Brazilian football right-back

Masculine given names